Barcelona Football Academy (Somateio Barcelona Podosfaírou Akadimía), 
is a women's football team from Germasogeia, Limassol, Cyprus, established in 2016.

They were crowned champions of the 2017–18 Cypriot First Division, and made their European debut in the 2018–19 UEFA Women's Champions League.

For major matches, they play at Limassol's main Tsirio Stadium.

European record

References

External links

Facebook page
UEFA profile

Women's football clubs in Cyprus
Association football clubs established in 2016
2016 establishments in Cyprus
Sport in Limassol